"Beyond Your Wildest Dreams" is a ballad written by British hitmaking team Stock Aitken & Waterman, which was recorded by three of their artists, Lonnie Gordon, Sybil, and Nancy Davis. The songwriters have cited this song as one of the best they ever wrote, and were dissatisfied with its poor chart performance. Gordon and Sybil's versions were released as singles.

Lonnie Gordon version

The song was written for American singer-songwriter Lonnie Gordon, and was released as the follow-up to her breakthrough top 10 hit "Happenin' All Over Again". Initially the follow-up single was going to be another song, the uptempo "How Could He Do This To Me", however disagreements with the label led to a change of the single choice and "Beyond Your Wildest Dreams" was released instead.

These disagreements created a delay on the release of the single and it was finally released in August 1990, seven months after "Happenin' All Over Again" had entered the UK charts. The song peaked at number 48 on the UK Singles Chart. Reasons for this failure may have been the long gap between singles, which may have died off public interest in Gordon, and also the fact that she released a ballad, when the public was expecting a song more in the vein of her first hit.

"Beyond Your Wildest Dreams" was later included on Gordon's 1991 debut album, If I Have to Stand Alone, in an extended version.

Critical reception
Pan-European magazine Music & Media commented, "...this Philadelphia-born singer has now teamed-up with the SAW production team. The result is excellent. A smooth soul/pop record that gives Gordon's excellent voice every chance to shine. Reminiscent of SAW's Donna Summer collaboration." David Giles from Music Week wrote, "Follow-up to her top five hit Happenin' All Over Again, but a distinct shift in style for the SAW production team moving away from the Hi-NRG field towards a mellower, laid-back soulful feel."

Track listing
 CD single (French)
"Beyond Your Wildest Dreams" 6:48
"Beyond Your Wildest Dreams" (senza voce) 3:48
"Beyond Your Wildest Dreams" 3:15

Charts

Sybil version

American artist Sybil worked with Mike Stock and Pete Waterman in 1993 (by that time, Matt Aitken had left the trio), and had two top 10 hits with a cover of "The Love I Lost" and the Stock/Waterman original "When I'm Good and Ready". Her cover of "Beyond Your Wildest Dreams" was chosen as the third single off her fifth album, Good 'N' Ready (1993), and was released in June 1993. It charted higher than the original version, but it only managed a number-41 peak on the UK Singles Chart.

Later in 1993, Sybil released the album in the United States, retitled Doin' It Now! and featuring a different track listing from the Good 'N' Ready album, omitting some tracks and adding new ones. Although "Beyond Your Wildest Dreams" was not included on the Doin' It Now! album, it was released as the second single off it in September 1993. The US single version is a very different hip-hop styled remix with a male rapper. The song peaked at number 90 on the Hot R&B/Hip-Hop Songs chart. It also charted on the Bubbling Under R&B/Hip-Hop Singles chart.

Sybil filmed video clips for both versions of the song.

Critical reception
Larry Flick from Billboard wrote, "British pop hit has been added to Sybil's current Doin' It Now opus. Percolating pop/dance ditty glides along at a friendly pace, with a silky vocal, rousing hand-claps, and appropriate hip-hop beat flavors." Alan Jones from Music Week rated it four out of five, adding, "After her two club hits, Sybil drops a few bpms to forge an attractive shuffle beat for this remake of the song first recorded by Lonnie Gordon. A majestic performance ensures that this will be yet another hit." James Hamilton from the magazine's RM Dance Update described it as "pleasant classy".

Charts

References

1990 singles
1993 singles
Lonnie Gordon songs
Sybil (singer) songs
Song recordings produced by Stock Aitken Waterman
Songs written by Pete Waterman
Songs written by Matt Aitken
Songs written by Mike Stock (musician)
1990 songs
Pete Waterman Entertainment singles
Supreme Records singles
Pop ballads